The Children of Mary of the Sacred Heart was a Catholic sodality founded by Saint Madeleine Sophie Barat in Paris.

References

Confraternities